The Long Call is a British crime drama television series developed by Kelly Jones and Silverprint Pictures based on the 2019 novel of the same name by Ann Cleeves. It premiered on ITV in the United Kingdom on 25 October 2021 and was released internationally as a BritBox original following broadcast.

Premise
The series follows Detective Inspector Matthew Venn as he returns to his hometown in Devon with his husband for his religious father's funeral, only to find himself investigating a local murder.

Cast

Main

 Ben Aldridge as DI Matthew Venn
 Declan Bennett as Jonathan Roberts
 Siobhán Cullen as Caroline Reasley
 Anita Dobson as Grace Stephenson
 Dylan Edwards as Ross Pritchard
 Sarah Gordy as Lucy Craddle
 Aoife Hinds as Gaby Chadwell
 Pearl Mackie as DS Jen Rafferty
 Neil Morrissey as Christopher Reasley
 Amit Shah as Ed Raveley
 Martin Shaw as Dennis Stephenson
 Juliet Stevenson as Dorothy Venn
 Alan Williams as Maurice Craddle

Recurring
 Melissandre St Hilaire as Ella Rafferty
 Iona Anderson as Rosa Shapland
 Nia Gwynne as Ruth Shapland
 John-Paul MacLeod as Alfie James

Episodes

Production
In November 2020, it was announced Silverprint Pictures would adapt Ann Cleeves' novel for ITV. Kelly Jones would pen the four-part drama as her first standalone series and third collaboration with Silverprint on a Cleeves adaptation, with Lee Haven Jones directing and Angie Daniell producing.

Principal photography took place in 2020 on location in Bristol and the North Devon coast, particularly around the Taw and Torridge estuary. Matthew and Jonathan's house is located in Appledore. Actor Ben Aldridge grew up in the area.

Reception

Accolades

References

External links
 

BritBox original programming
2020s British crime drama television series
2020s British LGBT-related drama television series
2020s British mystery television series
2021 British television series debuts
Gay-related television shows
ITV television dramas
Television series about religion
Television shows based on British novels
Television shows set in Devon
Television series by ITV Studios